John Lineham (21 March 1857 – 21 April 1913) was a territorial-level politician and businessman from Northwest Territories, Canada.

Lineham was born 21 March 1857 to Thomas Lineham and Barbara McIntyre in Mitchell, Upper Canada. He married Mary Elizabeth Martin in Collingwood, Ontario on 21 March 1894 and have two daughters. Lineham would head to Brandon, Manitoba and enter the cattle business, and later in 1883 he went to Calgary ahead of the Canadian Pacific Railway. Lineham purchased A. P. Samples' butcher shop with a partner and formed a successful meat business under the name "Dunn and Lineham", which would eventually be sold to William Roper Hull and later Patrick Burns.

Lineham was elected to the Legislative Assembly of the Northwest Territories in the 1888 Northwest Territories general election. He won the top place in the two-man district of Calgary. There were three candidates running for the two seats. Hugh Cayley was returned to the legislature as the second-place candidate. Lineham and Cayley were re-elected by acclamation in the 1891 Northwest Territories general election.

The electoral district was abolished and Lineham ran in the new High River electoral district in the 1894 Northwest Territories general election. He was easily re-elected and served his final term. He did not run for office after the assembly dissolved in 1898.

Lineham contested the November 1886 Calgary municipal election garnering 172 votes, but ultimately losing to George Clift King by 23 votes. In 1909 Lineham would be acclaimed as Mayor of Okotoks, Alberta, and subsequently acclaimed again in 1910.

Lineham formed the Rocky Mountain Development Company with George Leeson and engineer Allan Patrick, and on 21 September 1902 would make Alberta's first major oil strike in what is now Waterton Lakes National Park. The well site, Lineham Discovery Well No. 1 would be renamed First Oil Well in Western Canada and designated a National Historic Site of Canada on 17 May 1965.

John Lineham died in Calgary on 21 April 1913 from Bright's disease. Upon his death Lineham left a considerable estate worth approximately CA$500,000 which was mostly left to his daughters and other family members.

Honours
Canadian Petroleum Hall of Fame
Mount Lineham, a 2,485-metre mountain in Waterton Lakes National Park
Lineham Creek, a stream in Alberta
Lineham Provincial Recreation Area, a provincial park in Alberta.

References

External links
 
 
 

1857 births
1913 deaths
Members of the Legislative Assembly of the Northwest Territories
Mayors of places in Alberta
People from Perth County, Ontario